Breen v Amalgamated Engineering Union [1971] 2 QB 175 is a UK labour law case, concerning trade union regulation.

Facts
In 1958 Mr Breen was involved in, but absolved from, a dispute on misappropriating union funds. He was voted in as shop steward at his oil refinery in Fawley in 1965, but the district secretary in Southampton who had been party to the 1958 dispute rejected his election. Mr Breen said this was contrary to natural justice.

Cusack J held that rules of natural justice did not apply, and the committee had unfettered discretion under the rules. Only bad faith would suffice, and in any case the old dispute played no part.

Judgment
The Court of Appeal upheld Cusack J, so that Mr Breen's election could be rejected by the union. Edmund Davies LJ could see no authority for overturning the district secretary's decision otherwise. Megaw LJ agreed.

Lord Denning MR, dissenting, said administrative law applies to statutory and also to domestic bodies. He said that administrative law requires that people get fair hearings, and that discretion is only valid when irrelevant factors are not taken into account, even if the body is acting in good faith (decisions are otherwise set aside).

See also

UK labour law

Notes

References

United Kingdom labour case law